The Vijayawada BRTS is a bus rapid transit system for the city of Vijayawada.

Corridors 

There are six corridor for Vijayawada Bus Rapid Transist system are listed below: Minium route is of Bus terminal to City bys complex with length of 2.62 km and longest route is bus terminal to city bus terminal (round trip) (via Ramavarappadu Ring road junction, Benz circle) with length of 15.50 km.

References

Transport in Vijayawada
Bus rapid transit in India
Year of establishment missing